Dwight Sibblies is a Jamaican Labour Party politician who has been Member of Parliament for Clarendon Northern since defeating Horace Dalley in the 2020 general election.

References 

21st-century Jamaican politicians

Members of the House of Representatives of Jamaica
Jamaica Labour Party politicians
People from Clarendon Parish, Jamaica
Living people

Year of birth missing (living people)
Place of birth missing (living people)
Members of the 14th Parliament of Jamaica